Only Me is Normal is a 2021 Russian comedy film directed by Anton Bogdanov. It was theatrically released in Russia on December 2, 2021.

Plot 
The film takes place in the children's camp Red Falcon, which was declared emergency. Suddenly, a detachment of children with disabilities arrives at the camp. Director Igor Novozhilov uses everything he can to make them leave, but does not come out. And then, at the insistence of Igor, healthy children from poor families come to the camp.

Cast

References

External links 
 

2021 films
2020s Russian-language films
Russian comedy films